Carlia isotriacantha, the Monsoonal three-keeled rainbow-skink, is a species of skink. It is endemic to Australia; most records are from  the Kimberley region in Western Australia, but there are also some records from the border area between the Northern Territory and Queensland. It measures  in snout–vent length.

References

Carlia
Endemic fauna of Australia
Skinks of Australia
Reptiles of the Northern Territory
Reptiles of Queensland
Reptiles of Western Australia
Reptiles described in 2017
Taxa named by Ana C. Afonso Silva
Taxa named by Natali Santos
Taxa named by Huw A. Ogilvie
Taxa named by Craig Moritz